This is a list of Louisiana Confederate Civil War units. The list of Louisiana Union Civil War units is shown separately.

Confederate Army

Infantry
The following list includes infantry regiments and battalions.
 1st Infantry – served with Army of Northern Virginia
 1st Regulars, also called 1st (Strawbridge's) Infantry – served with the Army of Tennessee
 2nd Infantry
 3rd Infantry
 4th Infantry
 5th Infantry 
 6th Infantry
 7th Infantry
 8th Infantry
 9th Infantry
 10th Infantry
 11th Infantry
 12th Infantry
 13th Infantry
 13th-20th Consolidated Infantry
 14th Infantry
 15th Infantry
 16th Infantry
 16th-25th Consolidated Infantry
 17th Infantry
 18th Infantry
 18th Consolidated Infantry (merged with 10th Battalion, included in 18th Infantry)
 19th Infantry
 20th Infantry
 21st (Kennedy's) Infantry
 22nd Infantry (Patton's/Higgins', later 21st)
 22nd (Consolidated) Infantry (included in 22nd Infantry)
 23rd Infantry (Theard's/Herrick's, later 22nd)
 24th Infantry (Crescent Regiment)
 Consolidated Crescent Infantry (24th Infantry merged with 11th and 12th Battalions, included in 24th Infantry)
 25th Infantry
 26th Infantry
 27th Infantry
 28th Infantry (Gray's)
 29th Infantry (Thomas', sometimes shown as a second 28th)
 30th Infantry
 31st Infantry
 Miles' Legion (sometimes called the 32nd Infantry)
 33rd Infantry (short-lived merger of 10th and 12th Infantry Battalions)
 1st (Dreux's/Rightor's) Battalion, Infantry
 1st (Wheat's) Special Battalion, Infantry (Louisiana Tigers)
 3rd Battalion, Infantry (became the 15th Infantry)
 4th Battalion, Infantry
 5th Battalion, Infantry (became the 21st Infantry)
 6th Battalion, Infantry (became the 20th Infantry)
 7th Battalion, Infantry
 8th Battalion, Infantry (became the 8th Heavy Artillery)
 9th Battalion, Infantry
 10th Battalion, Infantry (Yellow Jackets)
 11th Battalion, Infantry (merged with Crescent Regiment)
 12th Battalion, Infantry (Confederate Guards Response Battalion, merged with Crescent Regiment)
 13th Battalion, Infantry (merged with 30th Infantry)
 14th (Austin's) Battalion, Sharpshooters
 15th (Weatherly's) Battalion, Sharpshooters
 30th Battalion, Infantry (after 30th Infantry was downgraded)
 1st (Coppens') Battalion, Zouaves (C.S. Zouave Battalion)
 2nd (Dupeire's) Battalion, Zouaves

Cavalry
 1st Cavalry
 2nd Cavalry
 3rd Cavalry
 3rd (Harrison's) Cavalry
 3rd (Wingfield's) Cavalry
 4th Cavalry
 5th Cavalry
 6th Cavalry
 7th Cavalry
 8th Cavalry
 9th (Ogden's) Cavalry
 18th Battalion, Cavalry

Partisan Rangers
 13th Battalion (Partisan Rangers)

Artillery

Light Artillery Battalions
 Pointe Coupee Artillery Battalion
 Washington Artillery Battalion

Light Artillery Companies
 1st Louisiana Field Battery (St. Mary's Cannoneers)
 1st Louisiana Regular Battery (Semmes' Battery)
 2nd Louisiana Field Battery (Boone's Battery)
 3rd Field Battery (Bell Battery)
 4th Field Battery (Cameron's Battery)
 5th Field Battery (Pelican Light Artillery) 
 5th Company, Washington Artillery (Louisiana)
 6th Field Battery (Grosse Tete Flying Artillery) 
 Bridges' Battery, Light Artillery
 Crescent Artillery, Company A (Hutton's Battery)
 Donaldsonville Louisiana Artillery (Maurin's Battery, Landry's Battery)
 Fenner's Battery
 Gibson's Battery (Miles' Artillery)
 Holmes' Battery 
 King's Battery (Bull Battery)
 Louisiana Guard Battery (Green's Battery)
 Madison Louisiana Light Artillery (Moody's Battery)
 Orleans Guard Battery (LeGardeur's Battery)
 Robinson's Horse Artillery 
 Watson Battery

Heavy Artillery

 1st Regiment Heavy Artillery
 2nd Battalion Heavy Artillery
 8th Battalion Heavy Artillery
 12th Battalion Heavy Artillery

Militia

 1st Chasseurs a pied, Militia
 1st Native Guards, Militia
 Assumption Regiment, Militia
 Beauregard Regiment, Militia
 Cazadores Espanoles Regiment, Militia
 Chalmette Regiment, Militia
 Claiborne Regiment, Militia
 Confederate Guards Regiment, Militia
 Continental Regiment, Militia
 Irish Regiment, Militia
 La Fourche Regiment, Militia
 Orleans Fire Regiment, Militia
 Orleans Guards Regiment, Militia
 Pointe Coupee Light Infantry, Militia
 Pointe Coupee Regiment, Militia
 St. James Regiment, Militia
 St. Martin's Regiment, Militia
 Terrebonne Regiment, Militia
 Vermillion Regiment, Militia
 Louisiana Legion
 Algiers Battalion, Militia
 Battalion British Fusileers, Militia
 Battalion French Volunteers, Militia
 Beauregard Battalion, Militia
 Bragg's Battalion, Militia
 British Guard Battalion, Militia
 Jackson Rifle Battalion, Militia
 Leeds' Guards Battalion, Militia
 Barr's Independent Company (Blakesley Guards), Militia
 Brenan's Company (Company A, Shamrock Guards), Militia
 Delery's Company (St. Bernard Horse Rifles), Militia
 French Company of St. James, Militia
 Knap's Company (Fausse River Guards), Militia
 Lartigue's Company (Bienville Guards), Militia
 Cavalry Squadron (Independent Rangers of Iberville), Militia
 Cagnolatti's Company, Cavalry (Chasseurs of Jefferson), Militia
 Continental Cadets, Militia
 Crescent Cadets, Militia
 Lewis Guards, Militia
 Mechanics Guard, Militia
 Mounted Rangers of Plaquemines, Militia
 Squadron Guides d'Orleans, Militia
 St. John the Baptist Reserve Guards, Militia
 Lafayette Artillery, Militia
 McPherson's Battery (Orleans Howitzers), Militia

1st Division

1st Brigade
 3rd Regiment, 1st Brigade, 1st Division, Militia
 4th Regiment, 1st Brigade, 1st Division, Militia

2nd Brigade
 1st Regiment, 2nd Brigade, 1st Division, Militia
 2nd Regiment, 2nd Brigade, 1st Division, Militia
 3rd Regiment, 2nd Brigade, 1st Division, Militia
 4th Regiment, 2nd Brigade, 1st Division, Militia

3rd Brigade
 1st Regiment, 3rd Brigade, 1st Division, Militia
 2nd Regiment, 3rd Brigade, 1st Division, Militia
 3rd Regiment, 3rd Brigade, 1st Division, Militia
 4th Regiment, 3rd Brigade, 1st Division, Militia

European Brigade
 1st Regiment, European Brigade, Militia
 3rd Regiment, European Brigade (Garde Francaise), Militia
 4th Regiment, European Brigade, Militia
 5th Regiment, European Brigade (Spanish Regiment), Militia
 6th Regiment, European Brigade (Italian Guards Battalion), Militia
 First Slavonian Rifles, Militia
 Second Slavonian Rifles, Militia
 Cognevich Company, Militia

French Brigade
 1st Regiment, French Brigade, Militia
 2nd Regiment, French Brigade, Militia
 3rd Regiment, French Brigade, Militia
 4th Regiment, French Brigade, Militia

State Guards
 1st Battalion Infantry (State Guards)
 1st Battalion, Cavalry (State Guards)
 2nd Battalion, Cavalry (State Guards)

Reserves
 1st Reserves
 2nd Reserve Corps

Misc
 Bickham's Company (Caddo Militia)
 Bonnabel Guards, Militia
 Borge's Company (Garnet Rangers), Militia
 Catahoula Battalion
 Conscripts, Louisiana
 Dubecq's Company, Cavalry
 Fire Battalion, Militia
 Herrick's Company (Orleans Blues)
 Jeff Davis Regiment, Infantry
 Lewis Regiment
 Lott's Company (Carroll Dragoons), Cavalry
 Louisiana and Government Employees Regiment
 Maddox's Regiment, Reserve Corps
 Miles' Legion
 Infantry Battalion
 Cavalry Battalion
 Millaudon's Company (Jefferson Mounted Guards)
 Miller's Independent Company, Mounted Rifles
 Ordnance Detachment
 Pelican Regiment, Infantry
 Red River Sharp Shooters
 Reserve Corps
 Sabine Reserves
 Siege Train Battalion
 Watkins' Battalion, Reserve Corps
 Weatherly's Battalion, Infantry

Artillery
 Beauregard Battalion Battery, Artillery
 Castellanos' Battery, Artillery
 Guyol's (Captain) Company (Orleans Artillery), Artillery
 Kean's Battery (Orleans Independent Artillery), Artillery

Cavalry
 Benjamin's Company, Cavalry
 Bond's Company, Mounted Partisan Rangers
 Cole's Company, Cavalry
 Dreux's Cavalry, Company A
 Greenleaf's Company (Orleans Light Horse), Cavalry
 Norwood's Company (Jeff Davis Rangers), Cavalry
 Nutt's Company (Red River Rangers), Cavalry
 Plains Cavalry
 Webb's Company, Cavalry

See also
Lists of American Civil War Regiments by State
Confederate Units by State

References

Citations

Bibliography 

National Park Service Civil War Soldiers and Sailors Website

 
Louisiana
Civil War